Denman is a small town in New South Wales, Australia, in Muswellbrook Shire. At the 2016 census, Denman had a population of 1,789.

Description
Denman is situated on the Hunter River near the Wollemi National Park. The main rural industries in the region are wine grape growing, horse breeding and farming. The town holds the annual Food and Wine Affair festival on the first Saturday of May.

Denman is also near Mount Rombo, a hill that has an unusual geometric shape causing to look like it has a perfectly flat top if it is viewed from Mangoola Road, a road that branches off the Golden Highway

It was sighted in 1824 by surveyor Henry Dangar, who named it Mount Cupola (for its domed shape). It was renamed by explorer Allan Cunningham, who became the first European to climb it the following year. Mount Dangar is a good place for walks, offering exceptional views of the area.

Defence Establishment Myambat, the Australian Defence Force's largest munitions storage facility, is located around 10 kilometres west of Denman.

Heritage listings
Denman has a number of heritage-listed sites, including:
 4883 Jerrys Plains Road: Merton

Population
According to the 2016 census of Population, there were 1,789 people in Denman.
 Aboriginal and Torres Strait Islander people made up 6.7% of the population. 
 86.9% of people were born in Australia and 93.2% of people spoke only English at home. 
 The most common responses for religion were Anglican 40.7%, Catholic 25.5% and No Religion 16.9%.

References

External links
Denman & District Development Association

Suburbs of Muswellbrook Shire
Towns in the Hunter Region
Hunter River (New South Wales)